Michael Stanley Lake   (born June 4, 1969) is a Canadian politician, businessman, and sports executive in Alberta, Canada who represented the riding of Edmonton—Mill Woods—Beaumont from 2006 to 2015 and has represented Edmonton—Wetaskiwin since 2015. He is a member of the Conservative Party of Canada and served as Parliamentary Secretary of Industry under Prime Minister Stephen Harper.

Early and personal life
Lake was born in New Westminster, British Columbia. He grew up in Devon, Alberta and obtained a Bachelor of Commerce degree from the University of Alberta. After graduating from university, he began a career with the Edmonton Oilers ice hockey team as a sales manager and director of ticket sales as their national accounts manager.

He has two children, his son is autistic and as a result he is a longtime member of the Edmonton Autism Society.  He is involved in the Alberta Foster Care Program.

Lake has regularly held breakfasts to raise funds for autism research.

Federal politics
Lake won the Conservative Party of Canada nomination for the riding of Edmonton—Mill Woods—Beaumont defeating seven-time candidate Tim Uppal. The nomination proved to be significant since popular long time Liberal incumbent David Kilgour had chosen to retire, creating a power vacuum in the riding.

Lake went on to win the vacant riding in a landslide victory in the 2006 federal election. Pundits had predicted the race would be closer as the Liberal Party of Canada had held the district and its predecessor ridings since 1991.

In his first term as a representative in the House of Commons of Canada, Lake was presented with a very unusual petition signed by almost 500 individuals calling for Bigfoot to be protected under the Species at Risk Act. Lake filed the petition with the Clerk of the House of Commons on March 28, 2007.  When interviewed, Lake said that he did not believe in Bigfoot, but filed the petition as a service to constituents without making any judgment call.

The 2015 federal election saw Lake's previous district eliminated in the 2012 federal electoral redistribution.  Lake ran for election as a Member of Parliament in the Edmonton—Wetaskiwin electoral district, winning with 65.7% of the votes.

After the resignation of Stephen Harper as leader of the Conservatives, now the Official Opposition, Lake announced that he would run for the interim leadership. The race was eventually won by Rona Ambrose. He was re-elected in the 2019 and 2021 federal elections.

Electoral record

References

External links
MP website

1969 births
Conservative Party of Canada MPs
Living people
Members of the House of Commons of Canada from Alberta
Members of the King's Privy Council for Canada
People from New Westminster
University of Alberta alumni
21st-century Canadian politicians